Chrysopida festiva is a species of leaf beetle in the subfamily Eumolpinae found in Luzon and Negros in the Philippines.

References 

Eumolpinae
Beetles of Asia
Insects of the Philippines
Taxa named by Joseph Sugar Baly